Annesley may refer to:

Places
Annesley, a village in Nottinghamshire, England
Annesley railway station, its station
Annesley Hall, Nottinghamshire, England
Annesley Woodhouse, Nottinghamshire, England
Annesley College, an independent girls' school in Adelaide, South Australia
Annesley Junior School
Annesley Hall, University of Toronto

People
Annesley, the family name of the Viscount Valentia
Earl Annesley, a noble title
Arthur Annesley (disambiguation)
Clare Annesley, British activist
Francis Annesley (disambiguation)
James Annesley (disambiguation)
Louie Annesley, British footballer
Richard Annesley (disambiguation)
Ryan Annesley (disambiguation)
William Annesley (disambiguation)
Annesley Malewana, Sri Lankan vocalist

See also
 Ainslie (disambiguation)
 Ainslee (disambiguation)
 Ansley (disambiguation)
 Aynsley